is a Japanese conductor known for his advocacy of modern composers and for his work with the San Francisco Symphony, the Toronto Symphony Orchestra, the Vienna State Opera, and the Boston Symphony Orchestra, where he served as music director for 29 years. He is the recipient of numerous international awards.

Biography

Early years
Ozawa was born on September 1, 1935, to Japanese parents in the Japanese-occupied city of Mukden. When his family returned to Japan in 1944, he began studying piano with Noboru Toyomasu, heavily studying the works of Johann Sebastian Bach. After graduating from the Seijo Junior High School in 1950, Ozawa broke two fingers in a rugby game. As he was unable to continue studying the piano, his teacher at the Toho Gakuen School of Music, Hideo Saito, brought Ozawa to a life-changing performance of Beethoven's Piano Concerto No. 5, which ultimately shifted his musical focus from piano performance to conducting. He went to the Toho Gakuen School of Music, graduating in 1957.

International success
Almost a decade after the sports injury, Ozawa won the first prize at the International Competition of Orchestra Conductors in Besançon, France. His success there led to an invitation by Charles Münch, then the music director of the Boston Symphony Orchestra, to attend the Berkshire Music Center (now the Tanglewood Music Center), where he studied with Munch and Pierre Monteux. In 1960, shortly after his arrival, Ozawa won the Koussevitzky Prize for outstanding student conductor, Tanglewood's highest honor. Receiving a scholarship to study conducting with famous Austrian conductor Herbert von Karajan, Ozawa moved to West Berlin. Under the tutelage of von Karajan, Ozawa caught the attention of prominent conductor Leonard Bernstein. Bernstein then appointed him as assistant conductor of the New York Philharmonic where he served during the 1961–1962 and 1964–1965 seasons. While with the New York Philharmonic, he made his first professional concert appearance with the San Francisco Symphony in 1962. Ozawa remains the only conductor to have studied under both Karajan and Bernstein.

In December 1962 Ozawa was involved in a controversy with the prestigious Japanese NHK Symphony Orchestra when certain players, unhappy with his style and personality, refused to play under him. Ozawa went on to conduct the rival Japan Philharmonic Orchestra instead. From 1964 until 1968, Ozawa served as the first music director of the Ravinia Festival, the summer home of the Chicago Symphony Orchestra. In 1969 he served as the festival's principal conductor.

He was music director of the Toronto Symphony Orchestra from 1965 to 1969 and of the San Francisco Symphony from 1970 to 1977. In 1972, he led the San Francisco Symphony in its first commercial recordings in a decade, recording music inspired by William Shakespeare's Romeo and Juliet. In 1973, he took the San Francisco orchestra on a European tour, which included a Paris concert that was broadcast via satellite in stereo to San Francisco station KKHI. He was involved in a 1974 dispute with the San Francisco Symphony's players' committee that denied tenure to the timpanist Elayne Jones and the bassoonist Ryohei Nakagawa, two young musicians Ozawa had selected. He returned to San Francisco as a guest conductor, conducting a 1978 concert featuring music from Tchaikovsky's ballet Swan Lake.

Boston Symphony Orchestra

Between 1964 and 1973, Ozawa directed various orchestras; he became music director of the Boston Symphony Orchestra in 1973. His tenure at the BSO was maintained for 29 years, the longest tenure of any music director, surpassing the 25 years held by Serge Koussevitzky.

Ozawa won his first Emmy Award in 1976, for the Boston Symphony Orchestra's PBS television series, Evening at Symphony. In 1994, the BSO dedicated its new Tanglewood concert hall "Seiji Ozawa Hall" in honor of his 20th season with the orchestra. In 1994, he was awarded his second Emmy for Individual Achievement in Cultural Programming for Dvořák in Prague: A Celebration.

In December 1979, Ozawa conducted a monumental performance of Beethoven's Ninth Symphony at the Peking Central Philharmonic. This was the first time, since 1961, that Beethoven's Ninth Symphony was performed live in China due to a ban on Western music.

In an effort to merge all-Japanese orchestras and performers with international artists, Ozawa, along with Kazuyoshi Akiyama, founded the Saito Kinen Orchestra in 1992. Since its creation, the orchestra has gained a prominent position in the international music community.

In the same year, he made his debut with the Metropolitan Opera in New York. He created a controversy in 1996–1997 with sudden demands for change at the Tanglewood Music Center, which made Gilbert Kalish and Leon Fleisher resign in protest.

In 1998, Ozawa conducted a simultaneous international performance of Beethoven's Ode to Joy at the opening ceremony of the 1998 Winter Olympics in Nagano, Japan. Ozawa conducted an orchestra and singers in Nagano, and was joined by choruses singing from Beijing, Berlin, Cape Town, New York, and Sydney – as well as the crowd in the Nagano Olympic Stadium. This was the first time a simultaneous international audio-visual performance had been achieved.

A controversy subsequently developed over various perceptions of the quality of Ozawa's work with the BSO. Ozawa stepped down from the BSO music directorship in 2002.

Ozawa has been an advocate of 20th-century classical music, giving the premieres of a number of works, including György Ligeti's San Francisco Polyphony in 1975 and Olivier Messiaen's opera Saint François d'Assise in 1983. He also became known for his unorthodox conducting wardrobe, where he wore the traditional formal dress with a white turtleneck, not the usual starched shirt, waistcoat, and a white tie.

Since 2001
In 2001, Ozawa was recognized by the Japanese government as a Person of Cultural Merit. In 2002, he became principal conductor of the Vienna State Opera. He continues to play a key role as a teacher and administrator at the Tanglewood Music Center, the Boston Symphony Orchestra's summer music home that has programs for young professionals and high school students. On New Year's Day 2002, Ozawa conducted the Vienna New Year's Concert. In 2005, he founded  and conducted its production of Richard Strauss's Elektra. On February 1, 2006, the Vienna State Opera announced that he had to cancel all his 2006 conducting engagements because of illness, including pneumonia and shingles. He returned to conducting in March 2007 at the Tokyo Opera Nomori. Ozawa stepped down from his post at the Vienna State Opera in 2010, to be succeeded by Franz Welser-Möst.

In October 2008, Ozawa was honored with Japan's Order of Culture, for which an awards ceremony was held at the Imperial Palace. He is a recipient of the 34th Suntory Music Award (2002) and the International Center in New York's Award of Excellence.

On January 7, 2010, Ozawa announced that he was canceling all engagements for six months in order to undergo treatments for esophageal cancer. The doctor with Ozawa at the time of the announcement said it was detected at an early stage. Ozawa's other health problems have included pneumonia and lower back surgery. Following his cancer diagnosis, Ozawa and the novelist Haruki Murakami embarked on a series of six conversations about classical music that form the basis for the book Absolutely on Music. 

On December 6, 2015, Ozawa was honored at the Kennedy Center Honors.

Honorary degrees
Ozawa holds honorary doctorate degrees from Harvard University, the New England Conservatory of Music, the University of Massachusetts Amherst, National University of Music Bucharest, and Wheaton College.
He is a Member of Honour of the International Music Council.

Awards and honors
 1958: Toho Gakuen School of Music: 1st Prize in conducting and composition
 1959: International Competition of Orchestra Conductors, Besançon, France
 1960: Koussevitzky Prize for Outstanding Student Conductor, Tanglewood
 1976: Emmy Award for Evening at Symphony
 1981: Grammy Award for "Best solo instrument performance with orchestra"
 1992: Hans von Bülow Medal (given by the Berlin Philharmonic)
 1994: Emmy for Dvořák in Prague
 1994: Inouye Award, Japan
 1994: Inauguration of Seiji Ozawa Hall at Tanglewood, the BSO's summer home in Massachusetts, where he also taught for the International Academy of Young Musicians
 1997: Musician of the Year (Musical America)
 1998: Conducted Beethoven's Ode to Joy at Nagano Winter Olympics opening ceremony 
 1998: Chevalier of the Légion d'honneur (France), for the promotion of French composers
 2001: Member of the Académie des Beaux-Arts of the Institut de France (Given by French President Jacques Chirac)
 2001: Person of Cultural Merit, Japan
 2002: Doctor honoris causa, National University of Music Bucharest, Romania
 2002: Austrian Cross of Honour for Science and Art, 1st class (Given by Austrian President Thomas Klestil)
 2002: Les Victoires de la Musique Classique (French CD prize)
 2003: Mainichi Art Award and Suntory Music Prize
 2004: Honorary Doctorate from the Sorbonne University of France
 2008: Order of Culture, Japan
 2009: Grand Decoration of Honour in Silver for Services to the Republic of Austria
 2011: Praemium Imperiale, Japan
 2011: Order of Friendship (Russia)
 2012: Tanglewood Medal awarded, In Honor Of Tanglewood 75th Season, BSO begins new tradition with first-ever medal awarded to Seiji Ozawa, BSO Music Director Laureate, Tanglewood
 2015: Kennedy Center Honoree
 2016: Grammy Award for Best Opera Recording
 2016: Honorary Member of the Berlin Philharmonic

Personal life
Ozawa has three brothers, Katsumi, Toshio, and Mikio, the latter becoming a music writer and radio host in Tokyo. Ozawa is married to Miki Irie ("Vera"), a former model and actress, born in 1944 in Yokohama and who is a quarter Russian and three-quarters Japanese; he was previously married to the pianist Kyoko Edo. Ozawa has two children with Irie, a daughter named Seira and a son named Yukiyoshi. During his tenure with the Boston Symphony Orchestra, Ozawa opted to divide his time between Boston and Tokyo rather than move his family to the United States as he and his wife wanted their children to grow up aware of their Japanese heritage.

Ozawa and the cellist and conductor Mstislav Rostropovich formed a travelling musical group during the later stages of Rostropovich's life, with the goal of giving free concerts and mentoring students across Japan.

Discography

 Bartók: The Miraculous Mandarin, Op. 19, Sz. 73 (suite); Music For Strings, Percussion & Celesta. Boston Symphony Orchestra, 1977 – DG
 Bartók: The Miraculous Mandarin, Op. 19, Sz. 73 (suite); Concerto for Orchestra. Boston Symphony Orchestra, 1994 – Philips
 Bartók: Music For Strings, Percussion & Celesta; Viola Concerto. Berlin Philharmonic, 1992, 1989 – DG
 Berlioz: Symphonie Fantastique Op. 14. Boston Symphony Orchestra, 1973 – DG
 Berlioz: Roméo et Juliette. Boston Symphony Orchestra, 1976 – DG
 Berlioz: Grande Messe de la Morte. Boston Symphony Orchestra, 1993 – RCA
 Berlioz: La Damnation de Faust. Tanglewood Festival Chorus, Boston Symphony Orchestra, Edith Mathis, Stuart Burrows, Donald McIntyre, 1974 – DG
 Berlioz and Debussy: Nuits d'été and La Damoiselle Élue. Tanglewood Festival Chorus, Boston Symphony Orchestra, Susanne Mentzer, Frederica von Stade, 1984 – Sony  
 Brahms: Symphony No. 1. Boston Symphony Orchestra, 1977 – DG
 Dutilleux: The Shadows of Time. Boston Symphony Orchestra, 1998 – Erato
 Dvořák: Dvořák in Prague: a Celebration. Prague Philharmonic Chorus, Boston Symphony Orchestra, Rudolf Firkušný, Yo-Yo Ma, Itzhak Perlman, Frederica von Stade, 1994 – Sony, and 2007 – Kultur Video
 Falla: El sombrero de tres picos. Boston Symphony Orchestra, Teresa Berganza, 1977 – DG
 Franck: Symphony in D minor. Boston Symphony Orchestra, 1993 – DG
 Ives: Symphony No.4; Central Park in the Dark. Boston Symphony Orchestra, 1976 – DG
 Lalo: Symphonie espagnol. Anne-Sophie Mutter, violin, National Orchestra of France, 1984 – EMI
 Liszt: Piano Concertos Nos. 1 & 2, Totentanz. Krystian Zimerman, piano. Boston Symphony Orchestra, 1987 – DG
 Mahler: Symphony No. 1 in D major; Blumine. Boston Symphony Orchestra, 1977 – DG
 Mahler: Symphony of a Thousand (No. 8). Boston Symphony Orchestra, Tanglewood Festival Chorus, 1981 – Philips
 Mendelssohn: A Midsummer Night's Dream – overture and incidental music, Op. 61. Tanglewood Festival Chorus, Boston Symphony Orchestra, Kathleen Battle, Judi Dench, Frederica von Stade, 1994 – DG
 Poulenc: Concerto in G minor for Organ, Strings & Timpani. Boston Symphony Orchestra, Simon Preston, 1993 – DG
 Orff: Carmina Burana. New England Conservatory Chorus Boston Symphony Orchestra, Evelyn Mandac, Stanley Kolk, Sherrill Milnes, 1970 – RCA
 Panufnik: Sinfonia Votiva (Symphony No. 8). Boston Symphony Orchestra, 1982 – Hyperion
 Poulenc: Gloria; Stabat Mater, Kathleen Battle, soprano. Boston Symphony Orchestra, 1987 – DG
 Prokofiev: Piano Concerto No.2, Yundi Li, piano. Berlin Philharmonic, 2007 – DG
 Prokofiev: Symphonie Concertante. Mstislav Rostropovich, cello. London Symphony Orchestra, 1987 – Erato
 Prokofiev: Symphonies Nos.1–7, including Revised Symphony No.4. Berlin Philharmonic, 1989–1992 – DG
 Ravel: Shéhérazade. Boston Symphony Orchestra, Frederica von Stade, 1981 – Sony
 Ravel: Bolero; Rhapsodie espagnol; Valses nobles et sentimentales; Ma Mere l'Oye; Menuet antique; Le Tombeau de Couperin; La Valse; Alborado del gracioso; Une Barque sur l'Ocean; Pavane poue une infante defunte; Daphnis et Chloé. Boston Symphony Orchestra, 1974–1975 – DG
 Ravel: Piano Concerto in G. Yundi Li, piano. Berlin Philharmonic Orchestra, 2007 – DG
 Respighi: Ancient Airs and Dances, 1979 – DG
 Respighi: Roman Festivals; The Fountains of Rome; The Pines of Rome. Boston Symphony Orchestra, 1978 – DG
 Saint-Saens: Symphony No.3; Phaeton; le Rouet D'omphale. Philippe Lefebvre, organ. National Orchestra of France, 1986 – EMI
 Sarasate: Zigeunerweisen. Anne-Sophie Mutter, violin. National Orchestra of France, 1984 – EMI
 Sessions: Concerto for Orchestra. Boston Symphony Orchestra, 1982 – Hyperion
 Shostakovich: Cello Concerto No.1. Mstislav Rostropovich, cello. London Symphony Orchestra, 1987 – Erato
 Stravinsky: Oedipus Rex. Peter Schreier, Oedipus; Jessye Norman, Jocasta. Saito Kinen Orchestra, 1992 – Philips
 Stravinsky: Suite from 'The Firebird'; Petrouchka. Boston Symphony Orchestra, 1970 – RCA
 Stravinsky: The Firebird (1910 version). Orchestre de Paris, 1973 – EMI
 Stravinky: The Rite of Spring. Chicago Symphony Orchestra, 1968 – RCA 
 Takemitsu: Quatrain (with Tashi); A Flock Descends into the Pentagonal Garden. Boston Symphony Orchestra, 1980 – DG
 Tchaikovsky: Symphony No. 5. Boston Symphony Orchestra, 1977 – DG
 Tchaïkovsky: Symphonie No. 6 'Pathétique'. Boston Symphony Orchestra, 1986 – Erato
 Vivaldi: The Four Seasons. Boston Symphony Orchestra, 1982 - Telarc

Bibliography
 Seiji: An Intimate Portrait of Seiji Ozawa (Hardcover) by Lincoln Russell (Illustrator), Caroline Smedvig (Editor) 
 A documentary film co-produced by Peter Gelb. Ozawa. Mayseles brothers film. CBS/Sony, 1989
 Absolutely on Music: Conversations with Seiji Ozawa by Haruki Murakami (New York: Knopf, 2016)

References

External links
 
 Seiji: An Intimate Portrait of Seiji Ozawa by Lincoln Russell
 Seiji Ozawa - Photographs and Video interviews on gettyimages.com

1935 births
20th-century conductors (music)
21st-century conductors (music)
Chevaliers of the Légion d'honneur
Culture of Boston
Deutsche Grammophon artists
Emmy Award winners
Grammy Award winners
Japanese conductors (music)
Japanese expatriates in Austria
Japanese expatriates in the United States
Japanese male conductors (music)
Japanese people from Manchukuo
Kennedy Center honorees
Living people
Members of the Académie des beaux-arts
Music directors (opera)
Music directors of the Vienna State Opera
Persons of Cultural Merit
Prize-winners of the International Besançon Competition for Young Conductors
Recipients of the Austrian Cross of Honour for Science and Art, 1st class
Recipients of the Grand Decoration for Services to the Republic of Austria
Recipients of the Order of Culture
Recipients of the Praemium Imperiale
Toho Gakuen School of Music alumni
San Francisco Symphony